Uģis Viļums (born 28 July 1979 in Saldus, Latvian SSR) is a Latvian professional basketball guard, who plays for Barons LMT. He is member of Latvia national basketball team.

References 

Living people
1979 births
ASK Riga players
People from Saldus
BK Ventspils players
BK Liepājas Lauvas players
Latvian men's basketball players
21st-century Latvian people